Se-hun, also spelled Se-hoon or Sei-hoon, is a Korean masculine given name. Its meaning depends on the hanja used to write each syllable of the name. There are 15 hanja with the reading "se" and 12 hanja with the reading "hun" on the South Korean government's official list of hanja which may be used in given names.

People with this name include:
Won Sei-hoon (born 1951), South Korean politician, former director of the National Intelligence Service
Oh Se-hoon (born 1961), South Korean politician, former mayor of Seoul
Min Se-hun (born 1963), South Korean discus thrower
David Oh (musician) (Korean name Oh Se-hun, born 1991), American singer in South Korea
Oh Se-hun (born 1994), South Korean singer, member of the South Korean group Exo

See also
List of Korean given names

References

Korean masculine given names